TJV may refer to:

 TJV, the IATA code for Thanjavur Air Force Station, Tamil Nadu, India
 TJV, the UCI code for Team Jumbo–Visma (men's team), Netherlands